Coleophora parvicuprella is a moth of the family Coleophoridae. It is found in southern Bulgaria, northern Greece and western Turkey.

The wingspan is 9.5-10.5 mm.

Etymology
The specific name is derived from Latin parvus (meaning small) and cuprum (meaning copper), referring to the small size of the adult and to the metallic sheen of the forewing.

References

parvicuprella
Moths of Europe
Moths of Asia
Moths described in 2006